There have been two baronetcies created for persons with the surname Vincent, one in the Baronetage of England and one in the Baronetage of the United Kingdom.

The Vincent Baronetcy, of Stoke d'Abernon in the County of Surrey, was created in the Baronetage of England on 26 July 1620 for Francis Vincent. For more information on this creation, see the Viscount D'Abernon.

The Vincent Baronetcy, of Watton in the County of Norfolk, was created in the Baronetage of the United Kingdom on 18 January 1937 for Percy Vincent, Lord Mayor of London from 1935 to 1936.

Vincent baronets, of Stoke d'Abernon (1620)
see the Viscount D'Abernon

Vincent baronets, of Watton (1937)
Sir Percy Vincent, 1st Baronet (1868–1943), for a time Lord Mayor of London
Sir Lacey Eric Vincent, 2nd Baronet (1902–1963)
Sir William Percy Maxwell Vincent, 3rd Baronet (born 1945)

References

Kidd, Charles & Williamson, David (editors). Debrett's Peerage and Baronetage (1990 edition). New York: St Martin's Press, 1990.

Baronetcies in the Baronetage of the United Kingdom
Extinct baronetcies in the Baronetage of England